The Second League (translit. Vtoraya Liga, also seen as RUS-4) was an ice hockey league in Russia. It was a fourth level league in the Russian ice hockey and it was divided into a two Divisions.

Teams
Team during the 2008-2009 Season.

References

Defunct ice hockey leagues in Russia